Hymenoscyphus is a genus of fungi in the family Helotiaceae. The genus contains about 155 species.

Species
Hymenoscyphus albidus
Hymenoscyphus albopunctus
Hymenoscyphus calyculus
Hymenoscyphus fraxineus
Hymenoscyphus fructigenus
Hymenoscyphus salicinus
Hymenoscyphus scutula
Hymenoscyphus scutuloides
Hymenoscyphus syringicolor

References

Helotiaceae